Baliqchi is a town in Andijan Region, Uzbekistan. It is the administrative center of Baliqchi District. Its population was 3,699 people in 1989, and 25,100 in 2016.

References

Populated places in Andijan Region
Urban-type settlements in Uzbekistan